Markus Kankaanperä (born April 27, 1980) is a Finnish professional ice hockey defenceman, currently with HC Bozen-Bolzano of the Austrian IceHL. Kankaanperä was most recently a member of the Dundee Stars in the UK Elite Ice Hockey League (EIHL). He was drafted by the Vancouver Canucks as their eighth-round pick, 218th overall, in the 1999 NHL Entry Draft.

References

External links

1980 births
Bolzano HC players
Brynäs IF players
Dundee Stars players
Finnish ice hockey defencemen
HIFK (ice hockey) players
HPK players
Living people
Löwen Frankfurt players
Jokerit players
Jokipojat players
JYP Jyväskylä players
Tappara players
Vancouver Canucks draft picks
People from Skellefteå Municipality
Finnish expatriate ice hockey players in Sweden
Finnish expatriate ice hockey players in Italy
Finnish expatriate ice hockey players in Germany
Finnish expatriate ice hockey players in Scotland